Willimantic Armory is a historic armory building on Pleasant Street in Windham, Connecticut.  It served the Connecticut National Guard from 1913 until 1980 when the building was sold to developers who converted the building into apartments.

History
In 1909, officials from the city of Willimantic requested funding for a modern armory from the Connecticut General Assembly.  Opposition by a few senators were concerned with the scope of military construction was overridden by supporters and the bill passed - allocating $50,000 to construct a single company armory.  A 300 foot by 160 foot lot was purchased from Samuel Chesbro for $6,500 and the architectural firm of Whiton & McMahon was awarded the contract to design the building and the builder F. D. Kent received $32,405 for the construction.

The armory was home to Company B, 169th Infantry until the 1960s when it was replaced by the 248th Engineer Company.  The armory remained the home of the 248th until it closed in the late 1970s when a new armory in Norwich, Connecticut was constructed and the unit transferred.

The Willimantic Armory was closed and sold to developers who converted the building into apartments while refurbishing and preserving the exterior of the building.  Renovation of the interior eliminated most traces of the original design.

The armory was added to the National Register of Historic Places in 1985.

Characteristics
The Willimantic Armory consisted of two distinct elements, both of red-brick construction.  The head house was a two-story, flat-roofed structure surmounted by a high parapet and a blocky tower.  The drill shed was a -story gable-roofed structure in the rear of the head house.

See also
National Register of Historic Places listings in Windham County, Connecticut

References

Armories on the National Register of Historic Places in Connecticut
Infrastructure completed in 1912
Buildings and structures in Windham County, Connecticut
Willimantic, Connecticut
Military in Connecticut
National Register of Historic Places in Windham County, Connecticut
1912 establishments in Connecticut